The Columbian Iron Works and Dry Dock Company (1872–1899), was located in Baltimore, Maryland on the Locust Point peninsula, adjacent to Fort McHenry. Founded by William T. Malster (1843–1907) who later partnered with William B. Reaney in 1879, it opened for business on 16 July 1880. The company was located on  adjacent to Fort McHenry where it leased the property from the Baltimore Dry Dock Company.

It built several early vessels of the United States Navy and United States Revenue Cutter Service, including: 
USRC Tench Coxe
USRC Seminole
USS Detroit
USS Petrel
USS Montgomery
USS Foote
USS Rodgers
USS Winslow
USS McKee
USS Tingey 
It also built the Argonaut, a submarine designed by Simon Lake, and Plunger, a submarine designed by John Philip Holland for the U.S. Navy that was not accepted.

It went into receivership in 1899 and was reorganized as Baltimore Shipbuilding & Dry Dock Company and was purchased by William B. Skinner and Sons in 1905. In 1915, Skinner and Sons went into receivership and was reorganized as the Baltimore Dry Dock and Shipbuilding Corporation. This company was taken over by Bethlehem Steel in September 1921.

References

"ASK FOR MORE TIME.; Columbian Iron Works Creditors Desire an Extension to Finish Work." New York Times. December 28, 1899, Wednesday Page 3, https://timesmachine.nytimes.com/timesmachine/1899/12/28/102500443.pdf
"Columbian Iron Works Failure."New York Times December 21, 1899, Wednesday Page 4, https://timesmachine.nytimes.com/timesmachine/1899/12/21/117936615.pdf
Keith, Robert C. Baltimore Harbor: A Pictorial History. Baltimore: Johns Hopkins University Press 2005. p. 93 
Knowles, Richard. John P. Holland, 1841-1914: Inventor of the Modern Submarine. Columbia, South Carolina: University of South Carolina Press, 1998.  p. 74
"Columbian Iron Works" in Directory of Iron and Steel Works of the United States and Canada. Philadelphia: American Iron and Steel Association v. 13 (1896) p. 256
"ANOTHER CRUISER AFLOAT; THE LAUNCH OF THE MONTGOMERY AT BALTIMORE. A NEW TWO-THOUSAND-TON WAR VESSEL NOW READY FOR HER MACHINERY AND FITTINGS -- CHRISTENED BY MISS SOPHIA SMITH." New York Times. December 6, 1891, Wednesday Page 16, https://timesmachine.nytimes.com/timesmachine/1891/12/06/103354840.pdf
"Argonaut Does It!" New York Sun, Dec. 17, 1897 http://www.simonlake.com/html/argonaut_does_it_.html
Forrest, Clarence H. Official History of the Fire Department of the City of Baltimore: Together with Biographies and Portraits of Eminent Citizens of Baltimore.Baltimore: Williams & Wilkins, 1898. pg 154
Hall, Clayton Coleman. M1 Baltimore: Its History and Its People Volume 1: History. New York: Lewis Historical Publishing Co., 1912. pp. 376–377
"William T. Malster" New York Times.  March 3, 1907, Sunday Page 7, https://timesmachine.nytimes.com/timesmachine/1907/03/03/104981296.pdf
Howard, George Washington."William B. Reaney" in The Monumental City: Its Past History and Present Resources . Baltimore: J.D. Ehlers,1873. p. 822
Howard, George Washington. "William T. Malster" in The Monumental City: Its Past History and Present Resources Baltimore: J.D. Ehlers, 1873. pp 670–673.
"CONSOLIDATION OF DRY DOCKS.; Negotiations Under Way for Two Companies in Baltimore."The New York Times. February 19, 1903, Thursday Page 1, https://timesmachine.nytimes.com/timesmachine/1903/02/19/101974141.pdf
"Columbian Iron Works Gets Extension" The New York Times. December 31, 1899, Wednesday Page 3, https://www.nytimes.com/1899/12/31/archives/columbian-iron-works-gets-extension.html

Defunct shipbuilding companies of the United States
Locust Point, Baltimore
Ships built in Baltimore